Tonga participated at the 2018 Summer Youth Olympics in Buenos Aires, Argentina from 6 October to 18 October 2018.

Competitors
The following is the list of number of competitors that participated at the Games per sport.

Archery

Tonga was given a spot to compete in the girl's event by the tripartite committee, but Tonga did not compete in archery.

Athletics

Tonga was given a spot to compete by the tripartite committee.

 Boys' events - 1 quota

Futsal

Tonga qualified in the girls' tournament by finishing runner's up at the 2017 OFC Youth Futsal Tournament and after New Zealand decided to compete in rugby sevens.

 Girls' tournament - 1 team of 10 athletes

Swimming

Tonga was given a quota to compete in the boy's event by the tripartite committee.

 Boys' events - Finau 'Ohuafi

Taekwondo

Tonga was given a quota to compete in the girls' +63 kg event by the tripartite committee, but Tonga did not compete in taekwondo.

References

2018 in Tongan sport
Nations at the 2018 Summer Youth Olympics
Tonga at the Youth Olympics